Qu Tanzhou is  the director of the Chinese Arctic and Antarctic Administration.

In 2007 Qu Tanzhou was the director of China's Polar Office of the State Oceanic Administration.

According to The Age in January 2010 Qu Tanzhou was part of a high-level delegation of senior officials that traveled to the Antarctic, led by Xu Shaoshi, China's Minister for Land and Resources.
The delegation travelled aboard the Xue Long, China's icebreaker.

Jo Chandler, writing in The Age, interviewed Qu when he visited Australia's Antarctic Casey Station.

References

Living people
Chinese environmentalists
Chinese academics
Year of birth missing (living people)